The American Legion Building in Spartanburg, South Carolina is a Colonial Revival building that was designed by architects Lockwood, Greene and Company and was built in 1937.

It was listed on the U.S. National Register of Historic Places in 2003.

References

Clubhouses on the National Register of Historic Places in South Carolina
Colonial Revival architecture in South Carolina
Buildings and structures completed in 1937
Buildings and structures in Spartanburg, South Carolina
American Legion buildings
National Register of Historic Places in Spartanburg, South Carolina
1937 establishments in South Carolina